Ibrahim Majekodunmi, (born 9 October 1981), better known by his stage name General Pype, is a pioneering Nigerian reggae/dancehall artist and songwriter. He gained international prominence through his very first single, “Keep It Cool” in 2007, which went on to be featured on the Golden Globe-winning American television series “The Shield” and through his biggest hit, “Champion” song in 2009 after being licensed by Supersport as its theme song and opening montage for its channels on DSTV, became the first song by any African artist to get such a deal by a television channel and received the remix treatment from Dagrin, Vector, Naeto C, Sasha & GT.

General Pype was a set designer on Black Panther, Samaritan and Guardians of the Galaxy, his sound is reggae fusion which incorporates elements of hip-hop, rock-pop and R&B into the riddims of reggae and dancehall which he calls a “tube-sound”.

Early life and education 
General Pype was born on October 9th, 1981, in Lagos State, Nigeria. He studied at St. Gregory’s Secondary School in Obalende, in 1998.

Music career 
General Pype began classically singing at a young age in the 90s, when he stumbled upon the choral group: the 30-man Triumphant Chorale Voices, one of the top three orchestral groups across the country, whose success allowed Pype to tour the continent, including performances in Abuja’s Eagle Square ushering in the new millennium; and at The Organization of African Unity Addis Ababa, Ethiopia. To pursue his other musical interests, he left the group where his new manager gave him the stage name “Pype,” which stands for Prolific Youth Positive Entertainer. By 2005, he had established himself as a reggae/dancehall performer performing on stage alongside both Nigerian and international acts including dancehall legend Sean Paul, internationally acclaimed singer Akon, and at the MTVBase Music Awards Hosted by Wyclef Jean in Kenya.

Pype gained international acclaim through the hit success of his very first single, “Keep It Cool” (2007), which went on to be featured on the Golden Globe-winning American television series “The Shield” and enjoyed prominence through songs like 'Give it to Me" (2012) and "Champion" (2009). In 2010, General Pype won The Most Gifted Reggae and Dancehall Video for Champion remix at Channel O music video Awards and also in 2010, he got nominated for the 2010 MTV Africa Music Award.

He started his own record label, Obalende Records in 2012, to reflect where he grew up and hails from. Obalende is a suburb in a remote part of Lagos State.

After a music hiatus since his last single “Mash It Up” in 2018 to take care of his family and pursue his education as a set designer at Georgia Film Academy. On March 1, 2022, Pype officially signed a management deal with distribution company CashBoy Records, founded in Accra, Ghana by Morgan Cashboy as he began working with Grammy-Award winning publishing and marketing agency Creative Titans, a JV partner of Concord Records.

Awards

Discography

Singles 

 "Champions" (2010)
 "Victorious man" (2012)
 "Champions Remix" (2015)
 "All the loving" (2016)
 "YShop is Open" (2017)
 "Mash it up " (2018)
 "Blessed and Ready" (2022)
 "Mine Only" (2022)
''Clear Road' (2022)

References

External links 

 Verified Twitter Account

Living people
1983 births
Musicians from Ogun State
21st-century Nigerian male singers
Nigerian male singer-songwriters
Nigerian hip hop singers
Nigerian reggae musicians
Dancehall musicians